In the sphenoid bone, the posterior border, smooth and rounded, is received into the lateral fissure of the brain; the medial end of this border forms the anterior clinoid process, which gives attachment to the tentorium cerebelli; it is sometimes joined to the middle clinoid process by a spicule of bone, and when this occurs the termination of the groove for the internal carotid artery is converted into a foramen (carotico-clinoid).

Etymology
The anterior and posterior clinoid processes surround the sella turcica like the four corners of a four poster bed. Cline is Greek for bed. –oid, as usual, indicates a similarity to. The term may also come from the Greek root klinein or the Latin clinare, both meaning "sloped" as in "inclined".

Additional images

Petroclinoid ligament 
The petroclinoid ligament is a fold of dura mater. It extends between the posterior clinoid process and anterior clinoid process and the petrosal part of the temporal bone of the skull. 

See posterior clinoid process page for full information on this ligament.

References

External links
 
 

Bones of the head and neck